Marco Zen (born 2 January 1963) is an Italian former professional racing cyclist. He rode in three editions of the Tour de France.

References

External links
 

1963 births
Living people
Italian male cyclists
Cyclists from the Province of Vicenza